Heathfield Community School is a community secondary school located at West Monkton in the outskirts of Taunton, England. It had 1,192 pupils aged 11 to 18, of which 78 were in the sixth form, in 2015, and has an Arts College specialist status. The headteacher is Hannah Jones.

History 
West Monkton Secondary Modern School was built in 1956. In 1978, the school merged with Priory Boys' School to form Heathfield Community School.

Since then, new buildings have been added, such as; the Sports Hall in 1979 and the English Centre in 1991. In 1990, the school performed a version of Peace Child which gave rise to a partnership with Kathleen Tacchi-Morris. In 1999, the Tacchi-Morris Trust donated £1-million along with £2.1 million from the Arts Council to build the Tacchi-Morris Arts Centre. The school has an annual Christmas Carol Concert, which involves pupils from all years, staff and members of the community.

Facilities 
A new sand-based astro pitch was opened in 2003 and was funded partly through local businesses. The pitch is used both by the school and the local community with a local six-a-side league held there on Monday evenings.

The Tacchi-Morris Arts Centre is a theatre which is open to the community but is also used by the school for teaching and performing. Some year-11 pupils perform their GCSE drama pieces in the theatre each year. The arts centre is also used by the school to perform musical concerts; however the Christmas concert is performed in the sports hall due to high demand.

"The Space" is a new 6th form facility based on the Heathfield School site offering a performing arts diploma. The first cohort of students started September 2009.

In September 2012, the school opened its new library and autism centre known as the Cedar Centre, costing £610,000. This allowed the conversion of the old library into a staff room and the old staff room into two new English classrooms. Somerset County Council considered Kingsmead School for the development but chose Heathfield as it "was a better option in terms of pupils travelling to the base".

In 2018, building began for a new performing arts building and an art & science block.

In 2023, The Board Of Governors approved for the school to become an academy starting from September 1st 2023 under the Cabot Learning Federation.
They also received funding to work on improving the toliets

Cafe Paramo 
Cafe Paramo allows pupils at the school learn business techniques by selling premium coffee and other merchandise. The project has been running since 2009. Through Cafe Paramo, the school has links to the Caxarumi co-operative in Ecuador and the Valdesian region of the Dominican Republic. The Caxarumi co-operative consists of 60 farmers in Loja. The proceeds of the project go directly to the farmers, the local communities and schools in the area. The money for the local schools funds the basics such as tables, chairs etc. In the Valdesia region it even helps a small orphanage. The project also is part of the year 8 'Multicultural Week'.

Student honorable mentions 
Some recent notable pupils include:
 Charlie Clough, footballer
 Joel Conlon, rugby player
 Adam Pengilly, skeleton racer
 Will Vaughan, rugby player

References 

Schools in Taunton
Secondary schools in Somerset
Community schools in Somerset